Rooting for Roona is a 2020 Indian documentary short film created, and directed by Pavitra Challam and Akshay Shankar. The film is based on the story of a girl named Roona Begum born with hydrocephalus. The film is produced by Curley Street and was released on Netflix on 15 October 2020.

Reception 
Udita Jhunjhunwala from the Firstpost gave 3.5 stars out of 5 and wrote, "The documentary sensitively captures not only Roona’s unusual case, but also the impact and stress on a young married couple on raising the child."

Awards 

 Audience Award for Best Short Film at the South Asian Film Festival of Orlando.

References

External links 

Rooting for Roona at Netflix

2020 short documentary films
Indian documentary films
Netflix original documentary films